Fatherland is the nation of one's "fathers", "forefathers" or "patriarchs".

Fatherland may also refer to:

 Fatherland (novel), an alternative history novel by Robert Harris
 Fatherland (1994 film), a television film inspired by Harris's novel
 Fatherland (1986 film), a film directed by Ken Loach
 Fatherland (album), by Kele Okereke, 2017
 "Fatherland", a song by Die Krupps from II - The Final Option, 1993
 Fatherland (horse) (1990–1993), an Irish-bred Thoroughbred racehorse
 The Fatherland, an American World War I-era pro-German periodical
 "Fatherland", a short story by Viet Thanh Nguyen

See also
 Fatherland Party (disambiguation)
 Fatherland Union (disambiguation)
 For the Fatherland, a compilation album by Prussian Blue
 Great Patriotic War (term), term for the Eastern Front of WWII in Russian historiography sometimes translated as "Great Fatherland War"
 Patria Grande, Spanish term sometimes translated as "Great Fatherland"